The UConn Huskies football team is a college football team that represents the University of Connecticut in the sport of American football. The team competes in NCAA Division I FBS as an Independent. Connecticut first fielded a team in 1896, and participated in Division I-AA until 1999. The Huskies began their two-year Division I-A transition period in 2000, and became a full-fledged Division I-A team in 2002. From 2000 to 2003 the team played as an independent. The school's football team then joined the conference of its other sport teams, the Big East (later named the American Athletic Conference (the American) in 2013), taking effect in 2004, through 2019. In 2019, the UConn football team left the American to again play as an independent, as the school's current primary conference, the current Big East, does not sponsor the sport. The Huskies are coached by Jim Mora.

History

Early years
The University of Connecticut began playing football in 1896 when the school was known as Storrs Agricultural College, and the team was known as the "Aggies." It teamed up with the University of Massachusetts Amherst and University of Rhode Island to form the Athletic League of New England State Colleges for the purpose of scheduling football matchups between the schools. The first year was spent playing against local high schools and YMCA clubs. The following year provided their first competition against future rivals Rhode Island, an opponent that would be played over 100 times, and Massachusetts. Other early rivals included the Ivy League and the "Little Ivies", particularly Yale University starting in 1948, who have played the Huskies for 50 years.

Tragedy struck the team on September 27, 1919, when Gardner Dow died from injuries related to a flying tackle that he delivered in a game against New Hampshire. The college would honor Dow by naming the athletic fields after him. These fields would become the home for most of the school's athletic teams for the next three decades.

In 1924, the Aggies celebrated their first undefeated season when they finished with six wins, no losses and two ties.  The defense was the strength of the team, as they allowed a meager thirteen points to be scored against them over the entire season, including a total of three points over the final seven games.  The team was proclaimed by The New York Times to be among the best in the country, and was led by the school's first All-America candidate in captain, Martin "Red" O'Neill.

The UConn Club memorializes O'Neill with a yearly award given to a former student-athlete who has had a successful professional career.

Red O'Neill went on to become one of Connecticut's first players to play in the NFL.  He played for the Hartford Blues in 1926, their only year in the NFL.  Another player is Art "Pop" Williams, winning a championship with the Providence Steam Roller in 1928 and also has the record for the most rushing career touchdowns in Providence's franchise history. The Steam Roller are New England's first NFL champion.

The renamed Huskies went on to become long-time members of the Yankee Conference, winning 15 conference championships.

In 2012, Bill Belichick stated in an interview on WEEI that in 1983 he applied for the Huskies' head coaching position but was eventually turned down in favor of an internal hire, Tom Jackson.

Transition to Division I-A

Connecticut hired Lew Perkins as its athletic director in 1990. One of Perkins' first projects was to gather facts for a possible upgrade of the football program to Division I-A. Perkins feared that if the university didn't upgrade the football program, that it ran the risk of falling behind other institutions that fielded both football and basketball teams at the highest level.  However, UConn was in the middle of a budget deficit and many faculty feared that an upgrade of the football program would result in a loosening of academic standards.

Transition to the Big East

Randy Edsall was named the 27th head football coach at the University of Connecticut on December 21, 1998 and led the Huskies from Division I-AA into Division I-A. UConn officially began the upgrade process in January 1999 by applying to join the Big East football conference. They would receive a special waiver from the NCAA in order to play in Memorial Stadium while Rentschler Field was under construction. UConn would become the first school to ever move from the FCS to the Bowl Championship Series as a member of the Big East after 3 years as an independent. The Huskies would spend the 2000 and 2001 as a transitional Division I-A program as they built their scholarship base to the maximum of 85. They recorded their first win over a Division I-A opponent on September 16, 2000, when they defeated Buffalo, 24–21. They would finish the 2000 season with a final record of 3–8.

2001
The 2001 season brought their first win over a BCS rival with a victory over Rutgers on September 29, by a score of 20–19. The growing pains continued, as they finished the season at 2–9.

2002
The breakthrough came during the Huskies' first year as a full-fledged member of Division I-A in 2002. Led by sophomore quarterback Dan Orlovsky, they showed vast improvement over the previous two seasons, despite starting the season losing six of the first eight games. They closed Memorial Stadium in fashion by routing the last two opponents, Florida Atlantic and Kent State, by a combined score of 124–35. The 63 points scored against Kent State in the Memorial Stadium finale, was the most the Huskies ever scored in the 50 years of playing in the stadium. They concluded a successful season by defeating Navy, 38–0, and Iowa State, 37–20. The victory over Iowa State was the Huskies' first win over a bowl-bound team.

Early entrance into the Big East
Connecticut was originally scheduled to join the Big East as a football member in 2005. However, following the departure of Miami, Virginia Tech, the Huskies' entrance into the Big East was expedited by one year. Boston College would leave the Big East at the conclusion of the 2004 season.

2003 First season at Rentschler field
The success continued in 2003, when Connecticut began play in Rentschler Field. They would finish the season with an overall record of 9–3. They opened the season with their first victory vs. a Big Ten team (34–10 over Indiana) and the final game of the season provided their first victory over an ACC opponent, when they defeated Wake Forest, 51–17. It was only the third time that a non-conference team had scored over 50 points in an ACC stadium. Despite the stellar record, the Huskies were not invited to play in a bowl game, largely due to their lack of conference affiliation.

2004 First season in the Big East
The Huskies played their first Big East conference game on September 17, 2004 when they dropped a 27–7 decision at Boston College. Their first Big East conference win came only 13 days later, when they defeated Pittsburgh 29–17. They completed their first season in the conference in 5th place with a record of 3–3. That year's overall record of 8–4 was enough to garner an invitation to the 2004 Motor City Bowl, the first bowl invitation in the school's history. The attendance of 52,552 was, at the time, a record crowd for the Bowl.

2005–2006
The Huskies were hit hard by graduation and injuries in the 2005 and 2006 seasons. The program opened one of the best and newest college football facilities in 2006 with the completion of the
$57.9 million (165,000 sq. ft.) Burton Family Football Complex & Mark R. Shenkman Training Center.

2007
The 2007 season saw a quick turnaround with the Huskies' first ever Big East Conference football title, which they shared with West Virginia. For the first time UConn beat a ranked opponent at home, defeating South Florida 22–15. UConn participated in the Meineke Car Care Bowl losing to Wake Forest 24–10. 

That was followed up with consecutive 8–5 seasons in 2008 and 2009 with wins in both of their bowl games (over Buffalo and the SEC's South Carolina).

2009
The team was hit hard in 2009 by the on-campus murder of junior cornerback Jasper Howard who was stabbed by a non-student outside a dance following their homecoming game win over Louisville. UConn struggled following his death, dropping their next three games and falling to 1–4 in-conference, but got a major win to break the streak at Notre Dame, a victory quoted by Coach Randy Edsall as being the program's "Best Win". The game ball from that victory was sent to Howard's mother in Miami, one of many tributes throughout the year for the fallen player. The team honored Howard prior to every game through the 2010 season, which would have been his senior year.

2010
The 2010 season brought a 2nd Big East Championship in 4 years and a trip to the 2011 Fiesta Bowl. After a loss in the Fiesta Bowl, to Oklahoma, Edsall did not fly home with or tell his players that he was leaving the UConn football program. He instead took a separate flight to Maryland to become their new head coach. It had also been noted in the media that Edsall's relationship with then-athletic director Jeff Hathaway had been strained for several years.

Paul Pasqualoni era
Two weeks after Edsall left for Maryland and after nearly seven years away from college football, Connecticut native Paul Pasqualoni was hired away as defensive coordinator from the Dallas Cowboys to lead the UConn football program, by the soon to be dismissed AD Hathaway. Following two seasons of mediocrity and a struggling offense, Pasqualoni was forced to replace his lifelong colleague George DeLeone as the offensive coordinator, just as he did prior to them both being fired at Syracuse. Pasqualoni named T. J. Weist as his OC for 2013. But Pasqualoni and Deleone (now his OL coach) were both fired after starting 0–4 with UConn's first loss as full D-I member to an FCS team, Towson 33–18 and following a humiliating defeat to Buffalo (41–12), which UConn had never lost to (8–0) as an FBS team. Weist was named the interim head coach and finished the season strong on a 3-game winning streak after starting out 0–5 and totally revamping the offense free of Pasqualoni's control.

Bob Diaco era
Though Weist was considered for the head coaching job, UConn AD Warde Manuel announced Notre Dame defensive coordinator and Broyles Award winner Bob Diaco as the new UConn head coach for the 2014 season. After a complete tear down of the program in 2014, which would lead to Diaco finishing the year with only around 60 scholarship players available and needing to use a dozen true freshman, the team finished 2–10. The 2015 season resulted in a revitalization for the program as they finished 6–6 and became bowl eligible for the first time since the 2010 season. On December 26, 2016, UConn announced Diaco, who posted his 3rd straight losing year with a 3–9 record would be fired effective January 2, 2017. By not making the move immediately, the school saved $1.6 million in buyout expenses.  He was replaced by former coach Edsall, making his return to the program after six years.

American Athletic Conference
The Big East's name changed in 2013 to the American Athletic Conference as a result of the non-FBS split that took place as part of the conference's three-way realignment between 2010–2013. Three members moved to the ACC as full members, Notre Dame went the ACC as a partial, Rutgers to the Big Ten and  West Virginia to the Big 12. With the seven non-FBS basketball schools buying the Big East conference name for their own newly formed conference.  Two teams departing to the ACC, Syracuse and Pittsburgh left the Big East with losing records against the Huskies in football.

Return to Independence
Following a 3–9 third season with the Huskies, Diaco was terminated at the end of the 2016 season.  His replacement, Randy Edsall, returning to the program after six years, would not find similar success in his second go-around. In 2019, after several years of losing records with a $41 million sports created deficit, UConn made the choice to leave the AAC and rejoin the current edition of the Big East. This is seemingly a basketball move because the Big East does not have football. The path will be to play as an independent.

The UConn football team left The American and became independent in August 2020 as a result of UConn's other sports rejoining the Big East, which does not sponsor football. UConn cancelled their 2020 season due to the COVID-19 pandemic. Their first season competing independently was in 2021. After three straight losing campaigns and a season cancelled by the COVID-19 pandemic in 2020, Edsall elected to retire after a 0–2 start in 2021.

To replace Edsall, UConn hired Jim L. Mora.  In his first season with the team, Mora would lead the Huskies to a surprising 6–6 regular season record, highlighted by an upset victory over then-No. 19 Liberty.  Bowl-eligible for the first time since 2015, UConn was selected to play in the 2022 Myrtle Beach Bowl against Marshall, in a rematch of their last bowl game.

Academics 
In 2010, Connecticut had 16 players named to the Big East All-Academic Football Team, an honor which requires a cumulative Grade Point Average (GPA) of at least a 3.0 in a minimum of two semesters. 
And several times UConn was ranked as one of the top bowl teams in the country per the annual Graduation Gap Bowl report.
In 2015, the team was honored by AF Coaches Assoc. for academic achievement and the 990 single year APR score in 2014–15 under head coach Diaco was also the highest in school history.

Conference affiliations

 Athletic League of New England State Colleges (1897–1922)
 New England Conference (1923–1946)
 Yankee Conference (1947–1996)
 Atlantic 10 Conference (1997–1999)
 NCAA Division I-A independent (2000–2003)
 Big East Conference (2004–2012)
 American Athletic Conference (2013–2019)
 NCAA Division I FBS independent (2020–present)

Postseason appearances

Division I-AA playoffs

Bowl games

Connecticut has participated in seven bowl games, with the Huskies garnering a record of 3–4.

Championships

Conference championships
Connecticut has won 25 conference championships, 15 shared and 10 outright.

† Co-champions

Division championships
The Huskies have won one division title, which they shared with UMass.

† Co-champions

Head coaches

Rivalries

Massachusetts

The Yankee Conference rivalry dates back to 1897. The rivalry became dormant in 1999 as UConn moved up to the FBS and UMass remained at the FCS level. The rivalry would be revived in UMass's FBS debut, a 37-0 win for the Huskies. Since 2018 each school has won two of the four contests. They are set to play again at a neutral site in 2023.

Rhode Island

The football rivalry dates back to 1897 and was centered around the Ramnapping Trophy after UConn students stole the URI mascot in 1934. The teams played nearly every year until the end of the Yankee Conference. Once UConn moved up to the FBS, the teams seldom play as Rhode Island remains an FCS program. Since 2000, there have been only 3 meetings; a UConn (52–7) win in 2006, a UConn (52–10) win in 2009, and a back-and-forth 56–49 UConn victory in 2018.

UCF

One other rivalry, known as the "Civil Conflict," unofficially exists between UCF and UConn. However, UCF did not acknowledge the rivalry, and has publicly dismissed it. Until 2021, when UCF trolled UConn by posting the Trophy on Twitter. UConn responded back by trolling their National Championship claim and Trophy.

Facilities

Pratt & Whitney Stadium at Rentschler Field

In 1997, the Big East Conference gave the University of Connecticut and Villanova University a December 31 deadline to decide if they were going to upgrade their respective football programs and join the Big East football conference. Villanova, a private institution, declined the invitation. However, in October 1997, the University of Connecticut Board of Trustees overwhelmingly endorsed, by a vote of sixteen to one, the football team's plan to upgrade the program to Division I-A status.  Part of the plan would be to build a new stadium, as the current stadium, Memorial Stadium, fell well below the minimum occupancy level of 30,000, as set by the NCAA.  Originally, the new stadium was to be built on campus.

However, the enthusiasm toward the new stadium quickly faded as the estimated expenses rose, the idea of an on-campus stadium was tabled, and the upgrade of the program was put on hold by the Connecticut state legislature. A year later, the stadium issue was rehashed during an attempt to bring the New England Patriots to Hartford, Connecticut. A proposed 70,000 seat, open-air stadium in downtown Hartford would also serve as the home of the Huskies football team. The plans for this stadium also fell through and the Patriots announced that they would remain in Foxboro, Massachusetts.  Eventually, a new site emerged across the Connecticut River in East Hartford, when Pratt & Whitney donated land on the old Rentschler Airfield to the state for purposes of building an off-campus football stadium which is 20 miles away from the main campus.

The inaugural game took place on August 30, 2003 when Connecticut defeated the Indiana Hoosiers 34–10. Since the opening, Connecticut has enjoyed a decided home field advantage, posting a 50–30 record when playing at Rentschler. In 2007, the Huskies completed their home season winning each of their seven home games, becoming only the second Big East team to compile a 7–0 home record. The stadium  played to an average of 97% near capacity crowds for eight years (2003–2010), prior to Paul Pasqualoni's arrival and during the Big East.

Burton Family Football Complex
The Huskies on-campus home is at the Burton Family Football Complex on Stadium Road in Storrs, Connecticut. It contains the coaches offices, team meeting rooms, video facilities, dining hall and student-athlete lounge. Construction began in the fall of 2004 and it officially opened in July 2006.
The building is named after Robert Burton, who in 2002 made a donation of $2.5 million to the University of Connecticut. The original location of the building was to be where Memorial Stadium stands. However, it was later decided to construct the building across the street.

Mark R. Shenkman Training Center
Alongside the Burton Family Football Complex is the  Mark R. Shenkman Training Center. The indoor training center includes a full-length football field and an  strength and conditioning center.  The training center was made possible by a $2.5 million gift from Connecticut businessman and UConn alum, Mark Shenkman.
Construction of the Mark R. Shenkman Training Center and the Burton Family Football Complex were handled in tandem by HOK Sport + Venue + Event and JCJ Architecture.  Upon completion in the summer of 2006, both buildings were granted a LEED silver designation. They are the first buildings on the University of Connecticut campus, and the first football facilities in the nation to be certified as a "green building."

Records

Record vs. Big East teams 

Official record against all former Big East teams (2004–12):

Record vs. AAC teams 

Official record against all AAC opponents (2013–2019):

Teams no longer in The American are in italics.

Notable alumni and personnel

Current NFL players

Current XFL players

Former NFL players

Former personnel
Edwin O. Smith – head coach; member of the Connecticut House of Representatives between 1933–1960
Leo Hafford – head coach; pitched for the 1906 Cincinnati Reds
Arthur Valpey – head coach; assistant coach for the 1947 national champions, the Michigan Wolverines
D. Robert Ingalls – head coach; center for the 1942 Green Bay Packers
Sam Rutigliano – assistant coach; head coach for the Cleveland Browns between 1978–1984
Rick Forzano – head coach; head coach for the Detroit Lions between 1974–1976
John Toner – head coach; president of the NCAA between 1983–1985
Robert Casciola – head coach; vice president and chief operating officer of the New Jersey Nets between 1987–1991
Lou Holtz – Hall of Fame coach; assistant coach; national champion as head coach at Notre Dame in 1988.
Skip Holtz – head coach and also former head coach at the University of South Florida; current head coach at Louisiana Tech University
Paul Pasqualoni – head coach and also former head coach at Syracuse University; winningest coach in Big East history

Brian Kozlowski Award
The Brian Kozlowski Award was first awarded in 1998. It honors the former UConn Husky and former New York Giants, Atlanta Falcons, & Washington Redskins tight end, Brian Kozlowski, who through hard work, effort and dedication has been able to have a lengthy NFL career.

Future opponents 
Announced schedules as of October 31, 2022.
UConn competes as an FBS Independent.

 At Neutral Site TBD

References

External links

 

 
American football teams established in 1896
1896 establishments in Connecticut